Brownswood may refer to:

Brownswood (ward), Hackney, London, England
Browns Wood, Walton, Milton Keynes, England
Brownswood Recordings, record label